Luis Español Bouché (Madrid, 1964) is a Franco-Spanish writer and translator, author of historical works and essays.

Works
In his works, it can be point out several research lines:
Biography of various humanitarian personalities like Clara Campoamor and Porfirio Smerdou, and other contribution on Human Rights questions.
The Spanish Civil War and Republican Exile. We can emphasize his book about the end of that War, his work about the exile of Óscar Esplá and his already cited publications on Porfirio Smerdou and Clara Campoamor.
The Monarchy and the Royal House of Spain.
The image of Nations and imagology, with his works about black legends, the France's image in Spain and the anti-Americanism. He is the biographer of Julián Juderías.
Another subjects in his works are duel, the Athenaeum of Madrid, San Ildefonso, biographies of some Spanish freemasons or the historical sources of Don Quixote.

Some books
Leyendas Negras: vida y obra de Julián Juderías (1877-1918): la leyenda negra antiamericana, Salamanca, Junta de Castilla y León: Consejería de Cultura y Turismo, 2007, 
Franceses en el Camino, foreword of José María Solé, presentation of Josep Corominas i Busqueta, Barcelone, Grand Lodge of Spain, 2005, .
Los leones del Quijote: de Juan de Austria a Guzmán el Bueno, Madrid, Cirsa, 2005, 
Madrid 1939: del golpe de Casado al final de la Guerra Civil: el Consejo Nacional de Defensa, el principio del exilio, la Diputación Permanente en París, Madrid, Almena, 2004, 
Nuevos y viejos problemas en la sucesión de la Corona Española: pragmática de Carlos III sobre matrimonios desiguales, derechos a la Corona de los hijos naturales, necesidad de una Ley de Sucesión, Doña Teresa de Vallabriga, Madrid, Instituto Salazar y Castro: Ed. Hidalguía, 1999,

Editions and translations
Edition and translation of Clara Campoamor, La revolución española vista por una republicana, Sevilla, Espejo de Plata, 2005. España en Armas, Nº 2. , 2nd. ed., 2007,

References
The Spanish Wikipedia article on Luis Español

1964 births
Living people
Writers from Madrid
Spanish male writers
20th-century Spanish historians
Spanish biographers
Male biographers
21st-century Spanish historians